Topaz is a fictional sorceress appearing in American comic books published by Marvel Comics. The fictional character was created by writer Marv Wolfman and artist Mike Ploog and first appeared in the comic book Werewolf By Night #13 (1974).

Publication history
Topaz debuted in Werewolf By Night vol.1 #13 (1974), and was created by Marv Wolfman and Mike Ploog. From 1974 to 1978, the character appeared as a supporting character and love interest of Jack Russel in the following issues of the series Werewolf By Night vol.1 #14-17, #27-43. They were also present in Giant-Size Werewolf By Night #3 and Tomb of Dracula vol.1 #18, #62-64.

From 1976 to 1991, she became a recurring supporting character of Doctor Strange in the following issue Dr. Strange vol.2 #75-81, Strange Tales vol.2 #1-3, #11, Dr. Strange vol.3 #2, #6-9, #26-28, #30 and Ghost Rider vol.3 #11-12.

In 1998, the character was present in the comic book Spider-Man Unlimited vol.1 #20. The following year, the sorceress is a supporting character of the mini-series Dr. Strange: Flight of Bones. Five years later in 2004, the writer Brian Patrick Walsh chose three witches Jennifer Kale, Satana Hellstrom, and Topaz as the three main characters of the mini-series Witches.

Fictional character biography
The character's origins and real name are unknown, even to herself. As an adolescent child, Topaz was found by the sorcerer Taboo, who was living in an Indian prison camp at the time. Also living in the prison camp, the locals feared the girl and called her a witch, as she was able to magically create flowers, move things with her mind and cause things to disappear. Wishing to use her abilities to his own ends, Taboo adopted her and named her Topaz. He used her as a familiar and taught her several magical spells. Years later, Taboo forced Topaz to use her powerful empathic powers to control the werewolf known as Jack Russell for a time. Taboo was searching for the magical Darkhold tome, of which he believed Jack was in possession. Cast out by Taboo after refusing to kill Russell, Topaz chose to help Jack learn to control his werewolf powers, and also became his lover. She assisted Russell many times, including helping him to learn about his family history and even helping him take on Dracula. Some time later, Topaz was exploited by Dr. Glitternight, who stole a portion of her soul. Jack's grandmother, Maria Russoff, also once used Topaz' power to raise an army of zombies as part of a mad revenge scheme. Topaz was eventually restored to sanity and Maria sacrificed her life once she saw that her actions had placed her grandson in danger. Topaz later used her powers to save Jack's sister, Lissa, from the werewolf curse (which was passed from generation to generation within their family). After discovering what Glitternight had done to her, Topaz fought and defeated the villain, regaining her soul in the process.

Topaz also temporarily destroyed the villain known as Mephisto, but the demon-lord's minions managed to trap her in another dimension with a spell that would remove another portion of her soul and rob her of her empathic powers if she ever left that realm. Later, Mephisto was revealed to be alive, and after he was once again destroyed by Franklin Richards of the Fantastic Four, Topaz was freed from her imprisonment. Her soul was eventually restored by Doctor Strange and the alien sorcerer known as Urthona.

As Topaz reached the age of 21, her powers reached their full potential, and she used them to heal the wounds of Doctor Strange's loyal servant, Wong. She left Strange's side when he briefly turned to the black magics, but later returned to aid him in his fight against Dormammu.

Later, Topaz led the quiet life for a while, running a bar called The Voodoo Lounge. However, once Dormammu got word of her whereabouts, he sought revenge and had one of his agents enslave the young sorceress. Once again, Doctor Strange came to her rescue. Topaz later helped Doctor Strange in yet another battle, joining forces with Jennifer Kale and Satana against the Hellphyr force and fighting yet more zombies and demons. After winning this battle, Topaz decided to leave Strange's side yet again, and founded the group known as the Witches in order to protect the world from mystical threats and prevent would-be thieves from stealing the Kale family's Book of Shadows.

Powers and abilities
Topaz is a powerful mystic with exceptional empathic, telepathic, and telekinetic/psychokinetic abilities. She can magnify or diminish emotions, infuse life energy, and heal injures. She can serve as a familiar to other sorcerers, focusing and magnifying their abilities. She can absorb pain, suffering, hatred, and fear from other humans into herself.

She has taken two separate forms, one blonde European and one brunette Indian.

Citations

Comic books

References

External links
 
 
 

Characters created by Marv Wolfman
Characters created by Mike Ploog
Comics characters introduced in 1974
Fictional empaths
Marvel Comics characters who use magic
Marvel Comics female superheroes 
Marvel Comics telekinetics
Marvel Comics telepaths 
Marvel Comics witches